The  was an infantry division of the Imperial Japanese Army. It was formed 16 January in Mudanjiang as a triangular division. It was a part of a batch of eight simultaneously created divisions comprising the 121st, 122nd, 123rd, 124th, 125th, 126th, 127th and 128th Divisions. The nucleus for the formation was the 4th Independent Border Group and the remnants of the 11th Division.

History
On 30 March 1945 the 122nd Division formation was complete and it was assigned to the 1st Area Army. It was tasked with garrisoning Mudanjiang. In June–July 1945, part of the division was moved to the Ning'an area.

At the start of the Soviet invasion of Manchuria the headquarters of the 122nd division were on the west coast of the Jingpo Lake. The 122nd Division surrendered to the Red Army on 17 August 1945.

See also
 List of Japanese Infantry Divisions

Notes and references
This article incorporates material from Japanese Wikipedia page 第122師団 (日本軍), accessed 28 June 2016
 Madej, W. Victor, Japanese Armed Forces Order of Battle, 1937–1945 [2 vols], Allentown, PA: 1981.

Japanese World War II divisions
Infantry divisions of Japan
Military units and formations established in 1945
Military units and formations disestablished in 1945
1945 establishments in Japan
1945 disestablishments in Japan